São José da Vitória is a municipality in the state of Bahia in the North-East region of Brazil.

Several of the communities in the municipality depend on water originating in the  Serra das Lontras National Park, created in 2010.

See also
List of municipalities in Bahia

References

Municipalities in Bahia